3,4-Xylenol is a chemical compound which is one of the six isomers of xylenol.

References

Alkylphenols